Rob Williams (born 9 December 1960) is a British lightweight rower. He now works as a rowing coach at Mersey Rowing Club and lives in Devonport, Tasmania, Australia.

References

 

1960 births
Living people
British male rowers
People from Devonport, Tasmania
World Rowing Championships medalists for Great Britain